J.E. Sumerau is an American non-binary trans woman who is a novelist and scholar. Their work focuses on "the intersections of sexualities, gender, religion, and health in the reproduction of inequalities that facilitate patterns of violence in society." They use the pronouns she/they.

Sumerau's work has twice been a finalist for the Lambda Literary Award for Bisexual Fiction.

Education and career 
Sumerau received a Bachelor of Arts in Political Science from Augusta State University, as well as a Master of Science and Doctor of Philosophy in Sociology from Florida State University.

Aside from writing, Sumerau is the editor of the Society for the Study of Symbolic Interaction Music Blog. She also works at the University of Tampa where she serves as an Associate Professor of Sociology and the Director of Applied Sociology.

Selected awards

Publications

Fiction 

 Cigarettes & Wine (2017)
 Homecoming Queens (2017)
 Other People’s Oysters, with Alexandra C.H. Nowakowski (2018)
 Palmetto Rose (2018)
 Via Chicago (2020)

Queering the Dixie 

 Essence (2017)
 That Year (2017)

Nonfiction 

 Negotiating the Emotional Challenges of Conducting Deeply Personal Research in Health, edited with Alexandra C.H. Nowakowski (2017)
 Christianity and the Limits of Minority Acceptance in America: God Loves (Almost) Everyone, with Ryan T. Cragun (2018)
 America Through Transgender Eyes, with Lain A.B. Mathers (2019)
 Expanding the Rainbow: Exploring the Relationships of Bi+, Polyamorous, Kinky, Ace, Intersex, and Trans People, edited with Brandy L. Simula and Andrea Miller (2019)
 Black Lives and Bathrooms: Racial and Gendered Reactions to Minority Rights Movements (2020)
 Transformations in Queer, Trans, and Intersex Health and Aging, with Alexandra C.H. Nowakowski and Nik M. Lampe (2020)
 Violent Manhood (2020)

References

External links 
 Official website

Living people
Florida State University alumni
Augusta State University alumni
University of Tampa faculty
Transgender academics
Year of birth missing (living people)
American non-binary writers